The Mactung Project is a planned open pit tungsten mine located in the Selwyn Mountains of eastern Yukon, Canada, on its border with the Northwest Territories. Mactung represents one of the largest tungsten resources in Canada having estimated reserves of 33 million tonnes of ore grading 0.88% WO3. The Mactung Project completed the Yukon Environmental and Socio-economic Assessment process in July 2014, and the Yukon government approved construction of the mine (pending mining and water licence applications, and subject to a number of conditions) in September 2014. North American Tungsten Corporation estimated the capital cost of the mine's construction to be approximately CA$400 million. In November 2015, the Government of the Northwest Territories purchased the mineral deposit.

References 

Tungsten mines in Canada